Francesco Aureri (active 1568–1578) was an Italian sculptor of the Renaissance period, active in Cremona.

References

Italian Baroque sculptors
Year of death unknown
Year of birth unknown
16th-century Italian sculptors
Italian male sculptors